The Conference League Cup 2007–08, known as the Setanta Shield 2007–08 for sponsorship reasons, was the inaugural season of the Conference League Cup competition after its resurrection by Conference sponsors Blue Square and competition sponsors Setanta. With the entrance of all Conference teams from every division, there were 68 entries into the tournament. The competition was won by Aldershot Town, who beat Rushden and Diamonds on penalties in the final.

Calendar

First round

The First Round was contested by 24 teams from the Northern and Southern Divisions, and divided into a Northern and Southern section. Matches were played in the week commencing 1 October 2007.

Northern Section

Southern Section

Second round

The Second Round will be contested by the 12 winners of the previous round, plus the remaining 20 members of the lower Conference Divisions. Matches will be played in the week commencing 12 November 2007.

Northern Section

Southern Section

Third round

The Third Round will be contested by the 16 winners of the previous round. Matches will be played in the week commencing 3 December 2007.

Northern Section

Southern Section

Fourth round

The 24 Conference Premier teams join the eight winners from the previous round. Matches will be played in the week commencing 22 December 2007.

Northern Section

Southern Section

Fifth round

Matches will be played in the week commencing 4 February 2008.

Northern Section

Southern Section

Quarter-finals

Matches will be played in the week commencing 26 February 2008.

Northern Section

Southern Section

Semi-finals

Matches will be played in the week commencing 18 March 2008.

Northern Section

Southern Section

Final

3 April 2008

Conference League Cup
Cup